Speakman No. 1 is a historic wooden covered bridge located at East Fallowfield Township near Modena in Chester County, Pennsylvania. It is a  Burr Truss bridge, constructed in 1881. It is a twin of Speakman No. 2, Mary Ann Pyle Bridge, located a 1/4 mile away. It crosses Buck Run.

It was listed on the National Register of Historic Places in 1980.

References 

Covered bridges on the National Register of Historic Places in Pennsylvania
Covered bridges in Chester County, Pennsylvania
Bridges completed in 1881
Wooden bridges in Pennsylvania
Bridges in Chester County, Pennsylvania
National Register of Historic Places in Chester County, Pennsylvania
Road bridges on the National Register of Historic Places in Pennsylvania
Burr Truss bridges in the United States